The Pontiac Star Chief is an automobile model which was manufactured by Pontiac between 1954 and 1966. It was Pontiac's top trim package on the Pontiac Chieftain, with later generations built on longer wheelbases, and serving as the foundation platform for the Pontiac Bonneville. The car was easily identified by its chrome star trim along its sides, a feature all Star Chiefs were equipped with.


First generation (1954)

Between 1954 and 1957, the Star Chief was Pontiac's prestige model and was based on the Pontiac Chieftain. In 1954, Pontiac also introduced air conditioning with all the components under the hood, a first for the price range. Seat belts were added as options in 1956. The Star Chief was available in Deluxe and pricier Custom trim, with the top trim level hardtop called the Catalina.

Prior to the introduction of the Star Chief, all Pontiacs had shared the modest wheelbase of the Chevrolet since the beginning of Pontiac.  The introduction of this new premier model in 1954 was the first application of the longer 123.5 inch (313.7 cm) wheelbase of the junior Oldsmobiles and Buicks to the Pontiac division. The car was still on the A platform, but with  added towards the rear of the frame. Power the first year came from Pontiac's venerable straight eight engine, with the six-cylinder not available. The eight produced  in the Star Chief, five more than when fitted to other Pontiacs.

Second generation (1955-1957)

Along with an all-new body, the straight-eight was superseded by the new Strato Streak V-8 power in 1955. Typical for the 1955 Pontiacs is the design with two wide "Silver Streaks" running the length of the hood. The hood ornament “Indian” was amber plastic that lit up when the headlights were turned on.  Also for 1955, the new Star Chief Safari two door hardtop wagon, which was similar to Chevrolet's Bel Air Nomad, was introduced, shared with the Pontiac Chieftain. This variant lasted through 1957; after that the Safari name was used for all of the division's standard four door wagons. The Safari was introduced on January 31, 1955, over three months behind the rest of the 1955s. Prices listed for the Star Chief averaged at US$2,594 ($ in  dollars ) and 203,404 were recorded to have been manufactured in 1955.

When the storyline of I Love Lucy pointed towards a Hollywood setting in the 1954-1955 season, the characters drove (in episode 110, "California Here We Come") to the West Coast in a red on white 1955 Star Chief convertible, that in the previous episode "Lucy Learns to Drive" was "bumped together" with a 1922 Cadillac Type V-63. General Motors was a sponsor of the show and the Pontiac was used several times for product placement.

The Safari was not quite part of the Star Chief line, as it sat on the shorter Chieftain  wheelbase. It was officially part of the "27 series", whereas the longer Star Chief received the "28 series" designation. In January 1957, some time after the rest of the new models, the four-door "Custom Safari Transcontinental" station wagon was introduced.

For 1956 the design was lightly revised, with heavier looking bumpers and a vertical slash on the front door above the swage line. In 1957, the high performance Star Chief Custom Bonneville was introduced as part of its divisional head's push to raise the marque out of the doldrums. The silver streaks running down the hood were dropped for the new "Star Flight" design. All gauges were placed in an oval on the dash and the side trim had a missile-shaped spear behind the front door.

Third generation (1958)

In 1958, the Bonneville was first given its own position in the Pontiac lineup as the ultimate Pontiac, and was only available as a two-door hardtop and two-door convertible. While no longer Pontiac's prestige model, the Star Chief remained a well-appointed car, and the division's finest four door hardtops and sedans. The 1958 Star Chief received all-new bodywork and an updated chassis with an appearance that was shared with all GM cars for that year. The body was considerably longer and lower, and featured a new honeycomb grille design and twin headlamps. The sedans and coupé models all shared the longer 124 inch wheelbase, while the Custom Safari model remained on a chassis two inches shorter, shared with the lesser Chieftain. In spite of the new bodywork, sales of the 1958 Star Chief dropped precipitously; down by around 60% while Pontiac's overall sales dropped by more than a third. 1958 was also the year the "Silver Streak" styling feature was no longer offered, which was first used in 1933.

The engine was updated from the  unit used in 1957 to a slightly bored out  version.

Fourth generation (1959-1960)

In 1959, when the Bonneville gained a full range of body styles, the Star Chief was limited to sedans and hardtops, while the Bonneville and the new Catalina models received the lion's share of Pontiac's attention in the marketplace. In 1959, the Star Chief made 17.97% of Pontiac sales.

In 1960, the new Ventura was introduced, and the Star Chief was thereafter limited to four door sedans and hardtops.  This was a novel, but unsuccessful approach. The Star Chief was equipped and powered in a manner similar to the lower-priced, slightly smaller Catalina series.

The Ventura was more lavishly equipped in the manner of the high-line Bonneville, but was available with only two doors and rode the Catalina's slightly shorter wheelbase. This gave sedan buyers of modest means a larger choice than Catalina for only slightly more money, and gave upscale coupe buyers a lighter, sprightlier alternative to the big Bonneville. The Ventura lasted only through 1961, and was replaced by the even sportier new Grand Prix. The Star Chief continued to be available only with four doors through the end of production.  Compared to the Catalina, the Star Chief was equipped only very slightly more lavishly; the major additional interior feature was the electric clock.

Fifth generation (1961-1964)

A rare option, it was probably never ordered on this somewhat heavy sedan. As in the other Pontiac series, the 4-door hardtop was designated the Star Chief Vista. Bonneville taillights and the three chrome stars on each side continued to distinguish the car from the Catalina. The stars were located either on the roof or rear fender, depending on year. No wagons were offered. All Safari wagons during this period (including the Bonneville Safari) rode the four and a half inch shorter wheelbase shared by Chevrolet and Catalina.

Sixth generation (1965-1966)

For 1966, the car was renamed the Star Chief Executive as the first step towards retiring the name, which by the mid-1960s had become dated. For 1967, Pontiac dropped the Star Chief name for United States sales and renamed the mid-priced model the Executive.

In Canada, Pontiac models used Chevrolet drivelines for greater economy.  To ensure that used car buyers in the U.S. were not sold less expensive Canadian models, different series names were used.  The Canadian equivalent to the Star Chief was called Laurentian.  Nonetheless, Pontiac offered a similarly-named series called the Strato Chief, but this model was the lowest-priced big Canadian Pontiac.

References

Star Chief
Rear-wheel-drive vehicles
Full-size vehicles
Convertibles
Coupés
Sedans
Station wagons
1950s cars
1960s cars
Motor vehicles manufactured in the United States